Ryan Murphy (born January 23, 1983) is an American former professional ice hockey forward who played five seasons in the AHL with the Manchester Monarchs, Hartford Wolf Pack, and Peoria Rivermen. He also played in the ECHL with the Charlotte Checkers. Murphy was selected by the Los Angeles Kings in the 6th round (185th overall) of the 2002 NHL Entry Draft. He was an assistant coach for the Bakersfield Condors of the ECHL in the 2013–14 season. He was an assistant coach for the Hershey Bears of the American Hockey League from 2014 to 2018 under head coach Troy Mann, and then followed Mann to the Belleville Senators.

Playing career

Amateur
At the age of 16, Ryan was named to the 1999-00 U.S. National U-18 Team in the North American Hockey League. That same season he dressed in four games with the U.S. Junior National Team. The following season he played 24 games with the U.S. Junior National Team.

Ryan played four years of collegiate hockey at Boston College playing with the Boston College Eagles (2001–05).

Professional
Immediately following graduation, Ryan turned professional suiting up with the Manchester Monarchs of the American Hockey League for the final five games and playoffs of the 2004–05 AHL season.

Ryan went on to play four more seasons in the AHL and ECHL before retiring from professional hockey after the 2008–09 AHL season.

Career statistics

Regular season and playoffs

International

References

External links 

1983 births
American men's ice hockey right wingers
Boston College Eagles men's ice hockey players
Charlotte Checkers (1993–2010) players
Hartford Wolf Pack players
Ice hockey players from New Jersey
Living people
Los Angeles Kings draft picks
Manchester Monarchs (AHL) players
People from Rumson, New Jersey
Peoria Rivermen (AHL) players
Sportspeople from Monmouth County, New Jersey